Senator Wing may refer to:

Merrick Wing (1833–1895), Wisconsin State Senate
Warner Wing (1805–1876), Michigan State Senate